Lan Saka is a district (amphoe) of Nakhon Si Thammarat province, southern Thailand.

History
The district was at first a minor district (king amphoe) named Khao Kaeo (เขาแก้ว), which was a subordinate of Mueang Nakhon Si Thammarat district. When the district office was moved to tambon Lan Saka, the district was renamed accordingly. In 1958 it was upgraded to a full district.

Geography
Neighboring districts are (from the north clockwise): Phrom Khiri, Mueang Nakhon Si Thammarat, Phra Phrom, Ron Phibun, Thung Song, Chang Klang, Chawang and Phipun.

Khao Luang National Park is in Lan Saka District.

Administration
The district is divided into five sub-districts (tambons), which are further subdivided into 42 villages (mubans). Lan Saka is a township (thesaban tambon) which covers parts of tambon Khao Kaeo. There are a further five tambon administrative organizations.

References

External links 
 Ban Khiri Wong
 amphoe.com
 Lan Saka township (Thai)
 Khao Luang National Park

Districts of Nakhon Si Thammarat province